Madō Monogatari I is a role-playing video game for the Mega Drive that was the last official Sega Mega Drive game released in Japan.  The game is part of the long-running Madō Monogatari series.

It is a later revision to the Game Gear version, Madō Monogatari I: Mittsu no Madō-kyū{{efn|{{nihongo|Madō Monogatari I: Mittsu no Madō-kyū|魔導物語I 3つの魔導球||lit. Story of Sorcery I: Three Magical Spheres}}}}, which is based on the original MSX and PC98 versions, and borrows heavily from the PC Engine version, Madō Monogatari I: Honō no Sotsuenji.

Gameplay
The game takes place in a 3D maze with obstacles, enemies, and characters to confront. Attacking monsters is similar to Paladin's Quest and the Phantasy Star series. A few examples of crazy items are Japanese curry, champagne, mini-elephant, and strange little crystals that may summon Santa. There is also a capsule item that allows players to capture enemies in a similar to the Pokémon video games. Once captured, these enemies will serve as allies to the main player. Both brains and brawn must be used as the battles and puzzles are equally difficult in the lower levels of the game.

Plot
Five-year-old Arle Nadja (later the protagonist in the Puyo Puyo'' series) is a member of the magic school. For her final exam, she must go through the Dark Prince’s tower. Her knowledge and skills will be greatly tested with the puzzles and illusions of fiends that are inside. Not all are illusions though, there may be rivals and friends in this tower. So Arle has to be on the lookout if she wants to pass this test.

Notes

References

Puyo Puyo
Compile (company) games
Fantasy video games
Japan-exclusive video games
Role-playing video games
Sega Genesis games
Game Gear games
TurboGrafx-CD games
Video games developed in Japan
Video games featuring female protagonists
1996 video games